Laurence "Larry" Blake (7 March 1909 – 5 October 1957) was an Irish hurler who played as a left wing-back for the Clare senior team.

Blake made his first appearance for the team during the 1929 championship and was a regular member of the starting fifteen for a decade until his retirement after the 1939 championship. During that time he won one Munster medal and was a regular member of the Munster team (inter provincial). Blake was an All-Ireland runner-up on one occasion.

At club level Blake was a one-time county club championship medalist with Ennis Dalcassians.

References

1909 births
1957 deaths
Ennis Dalcassians hurlers
Clare inter-county hurlers
Munster inter-provincial hurlers
Place of death missing